"Love Someone Like Me" is a song co-written and recorded by American country music artist Holly Dunn.  It was released in May 1987 as the first single from the album Cornerstone.  The song reached #2 on the Billboard Hot Country Singles & Tracks chart.  The song was written by Dunn and Radney Foster.

Charts

Weekly charts

Year-end charts

References

1987 singles
1987 songs
Holly Dunn songs
Songs written by Radney Foster
Songs written by Holly Dunn
MTM Records singles
Song recordings produced by Tommy West (producer)